Elections to Poole Borough Council were held on 3 May 2007 in line with other local elections in the United Kingdom. All 42 seats across 16 wards of this unitary authority were up for election.

There were 115 candidates nominated, comprised as follows:- 42 Conservatives, 36 Liberal Democrats, 16 Labour, 13 UK Independence Party, 5 Independents, 2 British National Party and 1 Green Party.

Election result summary

|}

Election results by ward

References

2007 English local elections
2007
2000s in Dorset